This is a list of airlines currently operating in Guam.

See also
 List of airlines
 List of defunct airlines of Guam

References

Guam
 
Guam
Guam

Lists of organizations based in Guam